The First Battle of Chattanooga was a minor artillery battle in the American Civil War, fought on June 7–8, 1862.

Background

In late spring 1862, the Confederacy split its forces in Chattanooga, Tennessee into several small commands in an attempt to complicate Federal operations. Union Maj. Gen. Ormsby M. Mitchel received orders to take his division to Huntsville, Alabama, to repair railroads in the area. Soon, he occupied more than 100 miles along the Nashville & Chattanooga and Memphis & Charleston railroads. In May, Mitchel and his men sparred with Maj. Gen. Edmund Kirby Smith's men.

Battle

After Mitchel received command of all Federal troops between Nashville and Huntsville on May 29, he ordered Brig. Gen. James Negley with a small division to lead an expedition to capture Chattanooga. This force arrived before Chattanooga on June 7. Negley ordered the 79th Pennsylvania Infantry out to reconnoiter. It found the Confederates entrenched on the opposite side of the river along the banks and atop Cameron Hill. Negley brought up two artillery batteries to open fire on the Rebel troops and the town and sent infantry to the river bank to act as sharpshooters. The Union bombardment of Chattanooga continued throughout June 7 and until noon on June 8. The Confederates replied, but it was uncoordinated since the undisciplined gunners were allowed to do as they wished. On June 10, Smith, who had arrived on June 8, reported that Negley had withdrawn and the Confederate loss was minor. This attack on Chattanooga was a warning that Union troops could mount assaults when they wanted. The attack also prompted Edmund Kirby Smith to withdraw Confederate troops from other areas to defend Chattanooga.  This redeployment of troops allowed George W. Morgan to capture the Cumberland Gap on June 18, 1862.

Battlefield preservation

The American Battlefield Trust and its partners have acquired and preserved  of the battlefield as of late 2021.

See also
Second Battle of Chattanooga
Chattanooga Campaign

Notes

References
National Park Service battle description
 CWSAC Report

Chattanooga I
Chattanooga I
Chattanooga I
Chattanooga I
Hamilton County, Tennessee
1862 in the American Civil War
1862 in Tennessee
June 1862 events